Echoes of the Fallen is the second and final studio album of heavy metal band, Anterior. It  was released by Metal Blade Records and the production was done by Scott Atkins.

Track listing
"To Live Not Remain" - 4:42 
"Blood in the Throne Room" - 5:08
"Tyranny" - 5:02
"Of Gods and Men" - 4:44
"By Horror Haunted" - 4:36
"Echoes of the Fallen" - 1:27 
"The Evangelist" - 3:57
"Sleep Soundly No More" - 5:11
"Venomous" - 4:12
"Senora de las sombras" - 5:24

Personnel
 Luke Davies - Vocals
 Leon Kemp - Guitar
 Steven Nixon - Guitar
 James Britton - Bass
 James Cook - Drums

References

2011 albums
Anterior (band) albums
Metal Blade Records albums